Jainey Kumar Bavishi is an American government official who has served since January 2023 as the assistant secretary of commerce for oceans and atmosphere, as well as the deputy director of the National Oceanic and Atmospheric Administration (NOAA), in the Biden administration.

She served as the director of the New York City Mayor's Office of Climate Resiliency from 2017–2021. She oversaw a $20 billion plan to prepare New York City for the impacts of climate change, including along the 520 miles of the city’s coastline. Bavishi was the associate director for climate preparedness at the White House Council on Environmental Quality during the Obama administration, where she led the implementation of the climate preparedness pillar of the president's Climate Action Plan.

Early life and education 
Bavishi was born in Bethlehem, Pennsylvania and grew up in Charlotte, North Carolina. She attended Duke University and earned a  degree in public policy and cultural anthropology. She later earned a Master of City Planning from the Massachusetts Institute of Technology. While at MIT, she traveled to New Orleans to work with disaster relief efforts after Hurricane Katrina.

Career 
Before attending graduate school, she worked in Orissa, India on a campaign to start childcare centers in communities below the poverty line.

Bavishi moved to New Orleans in 2006, where she led a coalition of Gulf Coast advocates working on equitable disaster recovery in the region. She was also the executive  director of R3ADY Asia-Pacific based in Honolulu, Hawaii.

During the Obama administration, Bavishi worked as a senior policy advisor and director of external affairs at the National Oceanic and Atmospheric Administration. Bavishi was also the associate director for climate preparedness at the White House Council on Environmental Quality during the Obama administration, where she led the implementation of the climate preparedness pillar of the president's Climate Action Plan.

In 2017, New York City mayor Bill de Blasio appointed her as the director of the New York City mayor's Office of Recovery and Resiliency. She oversees a $20 billion plan to help New York City prepare for the impacts of climate change, including sea level rise, intense rain and extreme heat. Mayor Bill de Blasio established the office in 2014, which includes a team of urban planners, architects, engineers, lawyers, and policy experts who use scientific evidence to develop programs and policies that address impacts of climate change.

Bavishi is a contributing author to the anthology, All We Can Save, edited by Ayana Elizabeth Johnson and Katharine Wilkinson.

US Commerce Department Nomination
On July 28, 2021, President Joe Biden nominated Bavishi for the position of Assistant Secretary for Oceans and Atmosphere in the U.S. Department of Commerce, as well as the deputy director of the NOAA. Hearings were held before the Senate Commerce Committee on her nomination on November 17, 2021. The committee favorably reported her nomination to the Senate floor on December 1, 2021. Bavishi's initial nomination expired at the end of the year and was returned to President Biden on January 3, 2022.

President Biden resent Bavishi's nomination the following day. On March 3, 2022, the committee favorably reported her nomination to the Senate floor once again. The Senate confirmed her nomination on December 22, 2022. She assumed office on January 17, 2023.

References 

Living people
Year of birth missing (living people)
People from Charlotte, North Carolina
Duke University alumni
Massachusetts Institute of Technology alumni
National Oceanic and Atmospheric Administration personnel
Biden administration personnel